Major General Wang Xiaojun is a Chinese military officer and diplomat who served as the Force Commander of the United Nations Mission for Referendum in Western Sahara. Prior to this appointment of 8 December 2016 by United Nations Secretary-General Ban Ki-moon, Major General Wang Xiaojun served as the Defence Attaché at several embassies of the People's Republic of China including to Brazil, India, Sweden and the United States.

Biographical Information
From 2003 to 2004, Major General Wang Xiaojun served at the United Nations Mission for the Referendum in Western Sahara (MINURSO). From 1992 to 1993 he was a United Nations Military Observer in Kuwait. He holds a master's degree from the Military Science Institution of the People's Liberation Army and a bachelor's degree in signals technology and command from the Nanjing Army Command College in China.

References

Chinese officials of the United Nations
United Nations military personnel
People's Liberation Army generals
Living people
1959 births